Moonah is a residential locality in the local government area (LGA) of Glenorchy in the Hobart LGA region of Tasmania. The 2016 census recorded a population of 5421 for the state suburb of Moonah.
It is a suburb in the city of Hobart, located approximately 5 km north of the central business district of Hobart, and lying directly north of the inner city suburb New Town.

History
Moonah was gazetted as a locality in 1961. The name has been in use since 1895. It is believed to be an Aboriginal word for "gum tree".

Originally land given free to settlers along the banks of the New Town Rivulet, this area eventually became known as the suburbs of New Town and Moonah.

Geography
New Town Rivulet forms most of the southern boundary.

Road infrastructure 
National Route 1 (Brooker Highway) passes along the eastern boundary, from where several roads provide access to the locality.

Today
The key transport axis of the suburb is Main Road, which runs between Derwent Park to the north and New Town to the south. Metro Tasmania routes run along this corridorformerly a tram routewith several stops in Moonah.

The Moonah shopping district is located largely between Florence Street and Amy Street, and includes a range of retail shops, restaurants and cafes, offices, banks, service stations, a newsagent, an auction house and a post office.

Large areas of the suburb are residential. Industrial zones are found along Charles St, Sunderland St and Gormanston Rd. Moonah is home to a major office of the state water company TasWater.

Glenorchy City Council's Moonah Arts Centre opened in 2015 and hosts exhibitions, events and classes.

References

Towns in Tasmania
Localities of City of Glenorchy